Important ecological areas (IEAs) are habitat areas which, either by themselves or in a network, contribute significantly to an ecosystem’s productivity, biodiversity, and resilience. Appropriate management of key ecological features delineates the management boundaries of an IEA. The identification and protection of IEAs is an element of an ecosystem-based management approach.

Important ecological areas may have varying levels of management of extractive activities, from monitoring up to and including marine reserve.  IEAs have management measures tailored to the ecological features within the area with consideration of socioeconomic factors.  Whereas marine reserves generally have a fixed management policy of no extraction or ‘no-take’.  Nonetheless, a marine reserve may be the appropriate management policy for an IEA.

The identification and management of IEAs is a form of ocean zoning.  In the event that there are a series of linked IEAs within a large marine ecosystem, a collective action to manage the network, such as a marine sanctuary or national monument, may be warranted.

Examples are tropical rainforests, oceans, forests, etc.

References

Ecology